The dotted tanager (Ixothraupis varia) is a species of bird in the family Thraupidae.

It is found in Brazil, French Guiana, Suriname, and Venezuela. Its natural habitats are subtropical or tropical moist lowland forests and heavily degraded former forest.

References

dotted tanager
Birds of the Amazon Basin
Birds of the Venezuelan Amazon
dotted tanager
Taxonomy articles created by Polbot
Taxobox binomials not recognized by IUCN